Joyce Byers (née Maldonado/Horowitz) is a fictional character and one of the protagonists of the American science fiction horror streaming television series Stranger Things. She is portrayed by Winona Ryder. Within the series' narrative, Joyce is the single mother of series protagonists Will and Jonathan Byers. In Season 4, she becomes Eleven's guardian. 

Joyce Byers' character and Ryder's performance has been well-received by critics, and earned Ryder one award and numerous nominations.

Characterization 

Ryder joined the cast of Stranger Things as Joyce in June 2015, along with David Harbour. Joyce was fashioned after Richard Dreyfuss's character Roy Neary in Close Encounters of the Third Kind, as she appears "absolutely bonkers" to everyone else as she tries to find her son, Will. In December 2017, Ryder was revealed to be reprising her main role for the third season. Ryder also received a pay raise in the third season.

Fictional character biography

Season 1 

In Season 1, Joyce Byers is depicted as a kind, caring, and sometimes frazzled single mother working at a general store in downtown Hawkins, who lives with her sons Jonathan and Will. It is implied she has a history of psychological issues. 

When her son Will goes missing, Joyce immediately alerts Hawkins Chief of Police Jim Hopper. At first, Hopper dismisses her concerns, suggesting Will might be with his father Lonnie. Hopper later becomes convinced Will is missing after finding the boy's bicycle abandoned in a wooded area the children call Mirkwood. 

Joyce begins to sense Will's presence in the Byers' home, but is unable to see him. She begins to receive mysterious phone calls, becoming convinced she can hear Will's breathing on the phone, but the calls always end with the family's home phone exploding. 

She is dismissed as crazy when she begins to see faded visions of Will through the wall and thinks that he is communicating with her by manipulating lights around the house, but she remains steadfast in her faith. Despite her concerns, Joyce continues to comfort her elder son Jonathan. When Joyce tells Jonathan of her findings, he too dismisses them as products of an overactive mind, but then begins to realize that what she sees is real when he visits the Upside Down with Nancy Wheeler. Joyce takes time off from work and asks for advances in her pay while searching for Will, which greatly annoys her boss.

When Will's body is found in a lake, Joyce becomes doubtful that even her own theories are true, but becomes certain that what they found drowned in a lake was not Will’s body, but either the corpse of another person or something entirely fake. Lonnie comes to visit and calm her, but when he sees what she has discovered, he tells her to give it up due to his belief that Will is truly gone. Both Joyce and Jonathan blow up at him and tell him to leave, and start working together to uncover more of the mystery. Meanwhile, Hopper discovers that his house has been bugged, and goes to check on Joyce.

They share what they have learned with each other, and find that both sides of the story match up. They then use Hopper's information about Hawkins Lab to sneak into the facility. After being apprehended and interrogated, Joyce and Hopper are permitted under Brenner’s orders to venture into the Upside Down with protective suits. There, Joyce discovers Will's body, and, after learning that he is still alive, takes him back to the real world. Will is brought home alive, and reunites with his friends whilst recuperating at Hawkins General Hospital. Joyce and Jonathan are relieved at his recovery; unbeknownst to either of them, however, Will coughs up a small slug-like creature, not unlike ones she and Hopper found lurking in the Upside Down.

Season 2 

In Season 2 of Stranger Things, set almost a year after the events of the first season, Joyce is shown happily dating newly introduced character Bob Newby, one of her high school classmates. Bob is depicted as a lovable nerd who enjoys solving puzzles and hates horror movies. Still traumatized from the events of Season 1, Joyce is shown to be overprotective of her son Will, no longer letting him bike around town by himself. With Hopper, Joyce regularly takes Will to Hawkins Lab, where the lab's doctors monitor his health and state of mind. Given her past experience with the lab, Joyce does not trust the lab's new director, Dr. Sam Owens, who has replaced Dr. Brenner following the latter’s disappearance. 

Joyce grows increasingly worried about Will, who begins having frequent “episodes” where he experiences realistic visions of the Upside Down. Dr. Owens tells her that Will is likely experiencing the "anniversary effect" of last year's traumatic events. Joyce remains unconvinced, even as Hopper, a Vietnam veteran, also suggests that Will might simply be suffering from PTSD. 

Hopper arrives at the house and asks if Will can remember anything from his most recent episode. After Joyce promises Will that she will not take him to the suspicious Dr. Owens, Will says that he does not remember anything beside the shadowy figure he had been drawing previously, which the children call the Mind Flayer. Due to Will’s inability to adequately describe the monster, Joyce asks if he can draw it. He agrees, but when Joyce and Hopper take a careful look at his pictures, they only see scribbles and lines. Joyce notes that some of the lines connect; this leads her and Hopper to figure out that the drawings form a map of interconnecting tunnels under Hawkins.

During an investigation, Hopper gets trapped in the underground tunnel complex, but Joyce, Bob, Mike, and Will are able to navigate the tunnels and rescue him. At this point, however, Will begins convulsing in pain, so they take him to Hawkins Lab for treatment. There, creatures dubbed “Demodogs” assault the facility, and Bob offers to reactivate the on-site power in order to facilitate an evacuation. He makes it back to the group in time, but is soon devoured by a Demodog just a few feet shy of the door. Joyce, shocked and depressed, returns home with Jonathan, Nancy, and Will. Angered by Bob’s death and desperate for an end to Will’s ordeal, Joyce burns the shadow monster out of Will while Mike lures the Demodogs away from the gate so Eleven can close it.

Season 3 
In Season 3 of Stranger Things, Joyce is noticing the magnets on her fridge are failing to magnetize. She finds this peculiar but goes to work where she sees Jim Hopper and give him advice on Eleven's relation ship with Mike. Hopper asks Joyce on a date and she agrees, but stands him up while going to ask science teacher Scott Clarke about the failing magnets. He tells her about a theoretical machine that affects the magnetic filed. Joyce goes to Hopper, sharing her suspicions that this is related to Hawkins Lab and the Upside Down. 

Joyce and Hopper go to the old Hawkins Lab and are ambushed by Russian assassin Grigori. They escape and head to the mayor where Hopper learns that the mayor is doing shady real-estate deals with the Russians. Joyce suspects that the machine is at one of the properties.

They go to one the real-estate properties and are attacked by Grigori again but escape and kidnap Russian Scientist Alexei. Joyce tries to interrogate Alexei, but he only speaks Russian. Joyce and Hopper go to see conspiracy theorist Murray Bauman so he can translate. They learn that the Russians opened the portal to the Upside Down using the machine, and Joyce and Hopper decide to call the CIA. 

Joyce and Hopper go to the Hawkins fair to find their kids. While looking for the kids they overhear Russians talking about kids at the mall and head there. Joyce and Hopper are reunited with the kids and are tasked with closing the Upside Down portal underground. 

Joyce and Hopper open up to each other and Joyce agrees to go on a date with him. They are attacked by Grigori and Hopper fights him but gets stuck in the room with the machine and portal. Joyce turns the key and destroys the machine which appears to disintegrate everyone in the room. Joyce believes Hopper is dead and adopts Eleven. Joyce decides to move her family out of Hawkins, taking Eleven with her.

Season 4 

In Season 4, Joyce and her kids (now including Eleven) have started a new life in Lenora, California. Joyce works from home as a telemarketer of encyclopedias. She receives a mysterious package with postage from the Soviet Union. Inside, she finds a Russian doll. She calls Murray, who suggests the doll might have been sent to her by the KGB, who want to capture her for her role in destroying the Soviets' secret operations under Starcourt Mall in Season 3. She realizes the doll is broken and finds a note inside it, which tells her Hopper is still alive and provides a phone number. 

Murray comes to California and helps Joyce call the phone number in the note. They soon realize Hopper is imprisoned in the Soviet Union, and that the person who sent them the note is one of his prison guards, code named "Enzo" after the Italian restaurant where Joyce and Hopper had planned to go on a date. Enzo tells them to bring $40,000 to Alaska, where his contact Yuri is going to fly them to Kamchatka. 

Not wanting to get Eleven's hopes up, Joyce decides not to tell her children about the possibility that Hopper is alive. Telling the kids she is going on a work trip, Joyce and Murray fly to Alaska and find Yuri. Yuri double-crosses them and Enzo. He drugs Joyce and Murray, binds them and takes them on his plane to turn them over to the Soviets. While they are aboard the plane, Joyce convinces Murray to subdue Yuri, but he accidentally knocks Yuri out, leaving no one to fly the plane. They crash-land but manage to arrive in Kamchatka, near the gulag where Hopper is imprisoned.  

Joyce and Murray come up with a scenario to enter the prison where Hopper is held. They get inside but are horrified to see Hopper and his fellow prisoners pitted against a vicious Demogorgon. After narrowly helping Hopper and Enzo escape, Joyce reunites with Hopper. 

Looking for a way out, Joyce, Hopper, Murray, Enzo and Yuri find Demodogs held captive around the prison, seemingly as subjects in scientific experiments. They also see a storm of black particles, which remind them of the Mind Flayer substance that possessed Will in Season 2.  

They escape to the nearby town, where Joyce and Hopper share their first kiss. They find out that their children are in mortal danger and fighting against the Upside Down once more. Recalling the Upside Down creatures' hive mind, Joyce deduces that they can help their kids by killing the Demogorgon and the Demodogs they saw, so they decide to re-enter the prison. 

Back at the prison, Hopper gets attacked by Demodogs, triggering a flashback for Joyce to her boyfriend Bob Newby's death at Hawkins Lab. In a cathartic moment, Joyce kills the Demodogs attacking Hopper, rescuing him. Murray uses a flamethrower to kill the rest of the Demodogs, while Hopper uses a sword to behead the adult Demogorgon. These victories happen in time to allow Nancy, Robin and Steve to attack Vecna's body in the Upside Down. 

Joyce and Hopper reunite with their children in Hawkins, where the Upside Down has begun to invade the town.

Reception

Awards and nominations 
Ryder won the Fangoria Chainsaw Awards in the category of Best TV Supporting Actress, as well as being nominated for the Gold Derby TV Awards for Drama Supporting Actress, and the Golden Globe Awards in the Best Actress – Television Series Drama category. Ryder was also nominated for the Satellite Awards in the category for Best Actress – Television Series Drama, the Saturn Awards in the category for Best Actress on a Television Series, and the Screen Actors Guild Awards in the category for Outstanding Performance by a Female Actor in a Drama Series along with Millie Bobby Brown, who appears in Stranger Things as Eleven.

References 

Female characters in television
Fictional salespeople
Horror television characters
Science fiction television characters
Stranger Things characters
Television characters introduced in 2016